The former Old Stone Church, also known as Calvary Episcopal Chapel, is an historic stone 
Late Gothic Revival-style Episcopal church building located at 206 North Wilcox Avenue in Buffalo, North Dakota, Built in 1885, it was designed by British architect George Hancock and built by Angus Beaton. Calvary Episcopal Chapel held its first services on October 15, 1886. In 1934, after years of many closings and reopenings, Calvary closed for the final time. In 1936, the building was bought by Buffalo Lodge No. 77 of the Ancient, Free & Accepted Masons. In the 1970s Buffalo No. 77 closed and in 1982 was merged with Casselton Lodge No. 3. In 1985, the Masons donated it to the Buffalo Historical Society, which 10 years later restored it. It is now called the Old Stone Church Heritage Center. On  October 22, 1995, the Buffalo Historical Society received national recognition for its efforts from the National Trust for Historic Preservation. On March 29, 1996, the Old Stone Church was added to the National Register of Historic Places.

References

Churches on the National Register of Historic Places in North Dakota
Episcopal church buildings in North Dakota
Masonic buildings in North Dakota
Gothic Revival church buildings in North Dakota
Stone churches in North Dakota
National Register of Historic Places in Cass County, North Dakota
Museums in Cass County, North Dakota
Historical societies in North Dakota